The Etiwanda Fire was a wildfire in the San Bernardino National Forest in the foothills north of Rancho Cucamonga. The fire started on April 30, 2014, during Santa Ana wind conditions of high temperatures and strong winds. On the first day, four schools and more than 1,500 homes were evacuated; residential evacuation orders were canceled that evening. Nine schools were closed on May 1, but they all were reopened on May 2. Many nearby communities were warned of unhealthy air quality. It burned  and was fully contained on May 10. The Etiwanda Fire was caused by an escaped illegal campfire.

References

Wildfires in San Bernardino County, California
2014 California wildfires